The Greek Ambassador to Russia is the ambassador of the Greek government to the government of Russia.

Greece–Russia relations

References

Russia
 
Greece